Fort Fincastle is a fort located in the city of Nassau on the island of New Providence in The Bahamas. It was built to provide protection to Nassau.

The fort was built in 1793 by Lord Dunmore to protect Nassau from pirates.

Built on Society and Bennet's Hills, the fort overlooks the city of Nassau and the Queen’s Staircase, and is often accessed that way by visitors on foot.

This fort shaped like a paddle-steamer, Lord Dunmore called Fort Fincastle, after his second title, Viscount Fincastle.

The fort overlooked Nassau and Paradise Island and the eastern approaches to New Providence. It mounted two 24-pounders, two 32-pounders, two 12-pounder cannons and one howitzer and served as a lighthouse until September 1817 when it was replaced by the lighthouse on Paradise Island (and was subsequently used as a signal station).

See also

 Fort Montagu
 Fort Charlotte (Nassau)
 Old Fort of Nassau

References

Buildings and structures in Nassau, Bahamas
New Providence
History of the Colony of the Bahamas
Forts in the Bahamas
Piracy in the Atlantic Ocean
1793 establishments in the British Empire